Pešes is a pop-rock band from Bosnia and Herzegovina, based in Široki Brijeg. The current lineup consists of Marko Karačić, Joško Klarić, Petra Brekalo, Nikola Kovačić, Matej Mikulić and Ante Zovko.

History

Pešes is a band from Široki Brijeg, Bosnia and Herzegovina, formed in 2008. In 2014 the band has released its debut album, called Bajka.
The band has played many important festivals, such as Ritam Evrope 2, Terraneo (along with The Prodigy and The Woods), WHF etc. They have signed with Croatian label Croatia Records.

Members

Current members 

 Marko Karačić - bass
 Joško Klarić - vocals
 Petra Klarić - vocals
 Nikola Kovačić - drums
 Matej Mikulić - guitar 
 Ante Zovko - guitar

Past members 

 Mateja Galić
 Petar Mikulić
 Filip Džajkić

Discography

Bajka (2014)

References

External links
 Facebook page
 Reverbnation profile

Bosnia and Herzegovina musical groups
Musical groups established in 2008
2008 establishments in Bosnia and Herzegovina